Warboys Clay Pit is a  geological Site of Special Scientific Interest west of Warboys in Cambridgeshire. It is a Geological Conservation Review site.

According to Natural England this "unrivalled Oxfordian section shows more than 20 metres of Upper Oxford Clay". It has ammonite fossils dating to the Late Jurassic, around 160 million years ago.

The site is private land with no public access.

References

External links

Sites of Special Scientific Interest in Cambridgeshire
Geological Conservation Review sites